Lawrence Pinsky is an American physicist specializing in relativistic heavy ion physics, and currently the John & Rebecca Moores Professor at the University of Houston.

Pinsky is also a licensed lawyer who deals in international patent law. He is one of the inventors of the board game Blitzkrieg.  He also designed several World War II wargames.

References

Living people
21st-century American physicists
Board game designers
Carnegie Mellon University alumni
University of Rochester alumni
University of Houston alumni
University of Houston faculty
Place of birth missing (living people)
Year of birth missing (living people)